Choi Hyang-nam  (born March 28, 1971, in Sinan, Jeollanam-do, South Korea) is a professional baseball pitcher, who is a free agent.

Choi is a Korean baseball pitcher who has played professionally in Korea since his debut in 1990. He pitched for the Haitai Tigers, the LG Twins and the KIA Tigers in Korean baseball from 1990 to 2005 before finally getting a shot in America when he signed with the Cleveland Indians in 2006 and played the season with the Buffalo Bisons. He was 8–5 with a 2.37 ERA with Buffalo in 34 games, 11 of them starts and struck out 103 batters while only walking 35.

He returned to Korea with the Lotte Giants in 2007.

In 2009, he joined the St. Louis Cardinals for spring training but failed to make the club and was released. He soon after signed with the Los Angeles Dodgers and was  assigned to the AAA Albuquerque Isotopes. Choi pitched great out of the bullpen for Albuquerque, going 9–2 with a 2.34 ERA. He walked only 21 and struck out 77. He was released on June 27, 2010.

In 2015, he joined an Austrian Baseball Team called "Diving Ducks" in Wiener Neustadt.

External links 

  Hyang-Nam Choi on "MILB.com"

1971 births
Living people
Haitai Tigers players
LG Twins players
Kia Tigers players
Lotte Giants players
Buffalo Bisons (minor league) players
Albuquerque Isotopes players
South Korean expatriate baseball players in the United States
South Korean expatriate baseball players in the Dominican Republic
Expatriate baseball players in Mexico
Águilas Cibaeñas players
Algodoneros de Guasave players
South Korean expatriate sportspeople in Austria